The fictional universe of the Star Wars franchise features multiple planets and moons. While only the feature films and selected other works are considered canon to the franchise since the 2012 acquisition of Lucasfilm by The Walt Disney Company, some canon planets were first named or explored in works from the non-canon Star Wars expanded universe, now rebranded Star Wars Legends.

In the theatrical Star Wars films, many scenes set on these planets and moons were filmed on location rather than on a sound stage. For example, the resort city of Canto Bight located on the planet Cantonica, seen in Star Wars: The Last Jedi (2017), was filmed in Dubrovnik, Croatia.

Star Wars canon astrography 

The Star Wars galaxy contains several broad sub-regions. Their exact definitions fluctuated somewhat during the Legends continuity, but were later formally updated by the new canon continuity when Disney purchased Lucasfilm. The new canon map is broadly similar to the later versions of the Legends galactic map.

As a general rule, most of the galaxy's wealth, power, and population are concentrated near the middle of the galactic circle – the "Core Worlds". The first major interstellar powers in the core are stated to have risen many millennia ago, gradually coalescing into the early Galactic Republic, with its capital at Coruscant. Waves of colonization (and conquest) by the Republic gradually spread outward from the Core, into the sparser systems at the galaxy's edge, such as Tatooine. Worlds of the Outer Rim are rich in raw resources but lack the population, infrastructure, or political power of the Core. Major galactic sub-regions are further divided into quadrants, sectors, etc., down to individual star systems and planets.

The galaxy has at least two companion-satellite dwarf galaxies, one of which is known as the Rishi Maze, but they are very lightly settled or explored.

The canon map depicts a top-down view of the galactic disk, with "north" as the side of the galactic center that Coruscant is located on. As the capital planet of the Republic and later the Empire, Coruscant is used as the reference point for galactic astronomy, set at XYZ coordinates 0-0-0. Standardized galactic time measurements are also based on Coruscant's local solar day and year.

According to the updated Visual Dictionary series made by Pablo Hidalgo for the Sequel Trilogy, these are the general regions of the galaxy spreading outward from the Core:

 Deep Core – the innermost brightly lit region of space, with a supermassive black hole at the center which binds the galaxy together. Densely-packed with stars, nebulae, and other anomalies, it is therefore thinly settled due to the resulting high radiation levels and lack of stable hyperspace routes.
 Core Worlds – powerful and wealthy planets with millennia-long histories, many of them founding members of the Galactic Republic. On-screen examples include Coruscant, Corellia, Alderaan, and Hosnian Prime.
 The Colonies – the first colonies founded by the nascent Galactic Republic in ancient times. The name is somewhat anachronistic, as they have grown nearly as powerful as the "Core Worlds" themselves, though their histories aren't quite as long or prestigious (i.e. comparable to how the United States or Canada could be called "the colonies" of Great Britain). Mentioned by name in The Rise of Skywalker.
 Inner Rim – the original edge of the Galactic Republic, where expansion waves stopped for many generations.
 Expansion Region – nestled between the "Inner Rim" and the "Mid Rim", anachronistically named due to a new colonization wave starting again.
 Mid-Rim – Generally industrialized though not very important planets, but more developed than the true "frontier" in the Outer Rim. On-screen examples include Naboo and Kashyyyk.
 Outer Rim – a vast region including all of the last major star systems up to the galaxy's edge. As the last region that the Republic expanded into, it is relatively the least developed, a frontier more often than not exploited by the central galactic government for its resources. On-screen examples include Tatooine, Yavin, Hoth, Bespin, Endor, Geonosis, Utapau, Mustafar, and Kessel.
 Wild Space – star systems located beyond the Outer Rim – because a galaxy's "edge" is not a fixed border line, but a concentration of stars tapering off in frequency. Unlike the Outer Rim, these sparse few systems around the galaxy's circumference were never formally charted. More broadly, Attack of the Clones established that the Star Wars galaxy actually possesses at least three small satellite galaxies, never colonized and considered largely inhospitable. The secret cloner-world Kamino, however, is located in one of these minor galactic clusters beyond the Outer Rim.
 Unknown Regions – the new Canon map establishes that, due to the stability of hyperspace lanes, inhabited planets are weighted toward the "eastern" quadrant of the galactic plane with the "western" one being mostly unexplored. These Unknown Regions are home to the first Jedi temple on Ahch-To and the Chiss Ascendancy, into which Grand Admiral Thrawn was born. The remnants of the Empire retreated here after their defeat at Endor, reforming into the First Order – as well as, secret even to the First Order, Darth Sidious' Sith forces reconstituting on Exegol.
 Western Reaches – the sectors once controlled by the Republic that border the Unknown Regions of the galactic "west". Essentially similar to the Outer Rim in terms of their history and economic development, the only difference being that instead of being located at the galaxy's physical edge, they are located at the edge of galactic exploration in the "western" side of the Republic. In The Force Awakens, it is stated in dialogue that Jakku is in the Western Reaches.

Apart from these broad regions radiating out from the galactic core, there are also several major galactic sub-regions of note:

 Mandalorian space – technically located in the Outer Rim, but relatively close to the border with the Mid-Rim, near Kashyyyk, in the galactic "northeast". The planet Mandalore had its own regional space empire in ancient times, led by their formidable warrior culture. The Mandalorians were the most difficult enemies the Jedi ever faced short of the Sith: they were not Force-wielders, but were a culture of regular humans who had honed themselves to possess the pinnacle of combat training, equipment, and battle tactics. During a series of long wars with the Republic, however, many centuries before the Clone Wars, the Jedi were eventually able to fight them into submission - though with heavy losses. In the Star Wars: Clone Wars animated series, both the Republic and the Separatists compete for support from rival Mandalorian factions, and in the later Star Wars: Rebels animated series, Mandalorians again divide into a proxy war between pro-Imperial and pro-Rebel forces. According to The Mandalorian TV series, this eventually resulted in the devastation of Mandalorian space by the Empire, with surviving enclaves scattering across the Outer Rim.
 Hutt Space – a fairly large swath of space along the "eastern" quadrant of the galactic plane, loosely straddling the border between the Mid-Rim and Outer-Rim. The Hutts are a kleptocratic Mafia state, derided as "gangsters" composed of several rival clans. The Hutts' resources and power are formidable enough that both the Republic and the Empire never bothered to conquer them, while the Hutts were too divided by their own internal politics to seriously challenge the Republic (unlike the Mandalorians).

This official galactic astrography was later re-confirmed for the first time in on-screen, live-action dialogue in The Mandalorian. In the second season's fourth episode, "The Siege", a classroom is briefly shown on a planet in the Outer Rim, in which a lesson on galactic astrography is being taught by a protocol droid. The teacher not only lists off each of these major regions from the Visual Dictionary, but lists them in the exact same order, from the Outer Rim to the Core:

"Who can name one of the five major trade routes in the galaxy? The Hydian Way [runs] from the Outer Rim to as far away as the Core Worlds. However, there are several other regions within our galaxy. They are the Mid Rim, the Expansion Region, the Inner Rim, the Colonies, the Core, and the Deep Core."

Star Wars canon planets and moons 
The following list names prominent planets and moons from the Star Wars films or other canon media.

Star Wars Legends planets and moons 
These are planets with multiple appearances in the Star Wars Expanded Universe, now rebranded as Star Wars Legends. The accompanying works were declared non-canon by Lucasfilm in April 2014, following its acquisition by The Walt Disney Company in October 2012.

Similarities to real-world planets 

The discovery of exoplanets in the real-world universe gained pace in the early 21st century. In 2015, the US space agency NASA published an article which stated that many of the newly discovered astronomical bodies possessed scientifically confirmed properties that are similar to planets in the fictional Star Wars universe.

Kepler-452b, a rocky super-Earth-type planet, is said to be similar to the Star Wars planet Coruscant. Likewise, the planets Kepler-16b and Kepler-453b, planets discovered orbitting binary stars probably resemble the desert world Tatooine. The hot, molten worlds of Kepler-10b and Kepler-78b are comparable to the volcanic planet Mustafar. OGLE-2005-BLG-390Lb, a cold, remote exoplanet, is like the ice planet Hoth. Kepler-22b, thought by scientists to be an ocean planet, is compared to the planet Kamino. According to NASA, there are also similarities to Alderaan and Endor in the real-world universe.

Solar System 
Two non-canonical works also feature the real-life Solar System's planets. Monsters and Aliens from George Lucas (1993) contains a feature, presented as a clip from a gossip column, in which a pair of Duros are abducted by humans and taken to "Urthha" (Earth), where they create havoc by misunderstanding terrestrial objects and food. In issue #19 of the comic series Star Wars Tales (2004), the story "Into the Great Unknown" finds Han Solo and Chewbacca in the Millennium Falcon, fleeing the Imperial Navy. They jump to hyperspace without doing calculations and find themselves in the middle of our Solar System, overpassing Saturn, Jupiter, and Mars while decelerating and landing in Northern America. Han is killed by Native Americans, and a mourning Chewbacca leaves the Falcon to live in the trees, where the natives believe him to be a sasquatch. In an epilogue set 126 years later, archaeologist Dr. Jones and his sidekick Short Round, searching for the sasquatch, find the Falcon and Han's remains.

See also 

 List of Star Wars filming locations
 Planets in science fiction

References

Sources 
  Content in this article was copied from The galaxy at the Wookieepedia, the Star Wars Wiki, which is licensed under the Creative Commons Attribution-Share Alike 3.0 (Unported) (CC-BY-SA 3.0) license.

External links 
 Galaxy Building, from Alderaan to Utapau at StarWars.com (official)
 Star Wars Canon: Just How Realistic Are the Single-Biome Planets? at The Escapist
 
 Interactive map of Star Wars galaxy

Planets
 
Star Wars
Lists of fictional locations
Fictional moons